This is a sound and video discography of Igor Stravinsky's ballet The Rite of Spring. The work was premiered in Paris on May 29, 1913 at the Théâtre des Champs-Élysées. It was presented by Sergei Diaghilev's Ballets Russes with choreography by Vaslav Nijinsky and was conducted by Pierre Monteux. The list includes many of the most noted recordings of the work but is by no means exhaustive. The avant-garde character of the music, combined with Nijinsky's innovative choreography, caused a near riot at the first performance. It has since gained wide acceptance both as a ballet and as a concert piece.

The discography is not exhaustive; new recordings frequently appear, as do reissues of older recordings. In the tables, the year given is not necessarily an accurate guide to the time of the actual performance, since sometimes recordings are held for many years before release.

On BBC Radio 3's Building a Library, music critics have several times surveyed recordings of The Rite of Spring. On 22 March 2008 Rob Cowan recommended the 2004 recording by the Junge Deutsche Philharmonie, Péter Eötvös (conductor), as the best available choice. On 6 July 2019 Jonathan Cross chose the version by Esa-Pekka Salonen and the Philharmonia Orchestra as his recommendation.

The Columbia Symphony Orchestra/Igor Stravinsky version from 1960 is the recording that was sent into space as part of the Voyager Golden Record.

Discography

Audio recordings: (orchestral)

Audio recordings: (derivative)

Audio recordings: piano versions

Video recordings

Notes and references
Citations

Book source

Discographies of classical compositions
Compositions by Igor Stravinsky